is a district located in Miyazaki Prefecture, Japan.

As of October 1, 2019, the district has an estimated population of 25,740 and the density of 114 persons per km2. The total area is 225.82 km2.

Towns and villages 
Aya
Kunitomi

Merger 
On January 1, 2006 the town of Takaoka merged into the city of Miyazaki.

Districts in Miyazaki Prefecture